= Naval captain =

Naval captain may refer to:

- Captain (naval), the name most often given in English-speaking navies to the rank corresponding to command of the largest ships
- Captain at sea, a rank equivalent to Captain (naval) in non-English-speaking countries such as Germany and the Netherlands
- Sea captain, a licensed mariner in ultimate command of the vessel
